Hong Kong Australians are Australian citizens or permanent residents of Hong Kong descent. Many Hong Kong Australians hold dual citizenship of Australia and Hong Kong.

Description 

Hong Kong people are generally bilingual or trilingual. Nearly everyone in Hong Kong from the younger generations can speak English. Cantonese is the language of people in Hong Kong. Most of the older generation of Hongkongese cannot speak Mandarin. Since 1997, more young generation in Hong Kong can speak Mandarin, due to efforts by the PRC government to increase the use of Standard Mandarin across China and to reduce the use of other Sinitic languages or dialects.

Hong Kong people can come from a variety of ethnicities. The Hong Kong ethnicity is itself very ambiguous and is mixed up with the other ethnicities of China, especially with the people from Guangdong. Hong Kong ethnicity was originally just a subgroup of Guangdong ethnicity, itself a subgroup of Han Chinese ethnicity. Nowadays, the idea of a distinct Hong Kong identity and ethnicity is becoming popular among supporters of Hong Kong Independence. Other Hong Kongers in Australia include the children of colonial parentage (British and/or other European (mostly Portuguese) heritage, and people with ancestries from other parts of the former British Empire).

History

According to the 2021 Australian census, 100,148 Australians were born in Hong Kong; a figure that would exclude first-generation immigrants from Hong Kong who were born elsewhere, as well as descendants of immigrants who were born in Australia. The corresponding figure on ancestry was not collected.

Notable Hong Kong Australians

 Benjamin Law – writer and journalist
 Clara Law – film director (born in Macau)
 John So, AO,  JP– 102nd Lord Mayor of Melbourne
 Raymond Chan – basketballer
 Lindy Hou, OAM – Paralympic Games and World Champion Tandem Cyclist
 Kenneth To – swimmer
 Gladys Liu - Liberal member for Chisholm
 Curtis Cheng - victim of Jihadist terrorist attack during the 2015 Parramatta shooting
 Jared Lum – footballer
 Sam Chui - Aviation blogger
Brad Turvey - former model and TV host in the Philippines (born in Hong Kong to a Hong Kong Chinese mother)
Jessica Gomes - model (born in Singapore to Hong Kong Chinese mother)
Stephanie Jacobsen - actress & TV host (born in Hong Kong)
Anjali Rao - journalist & TV news program host (born in Hong Kong)

See also 

 Chinese Australians
 Taiwanese Australians
 Australians in Hong Kong
 Hong Kong Economic and Trade Office, Sydney

References 

 
Asian Australian
 
Hong Kong diaspora